Smithatris supraneanae is a monocotyledonous plant species described by Walter John Emil Kress and Kai Larsen. Smithatris supraneanae is part of the genus Smithatris and the family Zingiberaceae. The IUCN categorizes the species globally as critically endangered. The species' range is in Thailand. No subspecies are listed in the Catalog of Life.

The species and genus' taxonomic name is based on two scientific researchers, Scottish botanist Rosemary M. Smith, and the original person who notified Kress and Larsen of the species, Supranee Kongpichayanond.

References 

Zingiberoideae